Ceric  may refer to:

 Cerium, a chemical element